Authon-du-Perche (literally Authon of the Perche) is a commune in the Eure-et-Loir department in northern France. On 1 January 2019, the former commune Soizé was merged into Authon-du-Perche. The source of the river Braye is near the commune.

Population

See also
 Communes of the Eure-et-Loir department
 Perche

References

Communes of Eure-et-Loir
Perche